Shahrak-e Golmarz (also known as Golmarz) is a village in Bash Qaleh Rural District, in the Central District of Urmia County, West Azerbaijan Province, Iran. At the 2006 census, its population was 483, in 131 families.

References 

Populated places in Urmia County